Mount Verhage is a prominent mountain standing directly at the head of Smithson Glacier in the Bowers Mountains in Antarctica. It was mapped by the United States Geological Survey (USGS) from ground surveys and U.S. Navy air photos, 1960–62, and was named by the Advisory Committee on Antarctic Names (US-ACAN) for Lieutenant Ronald G. Verhage, U.S. Navy, supply officer at McMurdo Station, winter party, 1967.

Mountains of Victoria Land
Pennell Coast